Benjamin David Williams (29 October 1900 – 5 January 1968) was a Welsh international footballer who made 249 appearances in the English League playing as a full back for Swansea Town, Everton and Newport County.

Sale of medal
In May 2005, his Second Division Championship winning medal was sold for £1,900 at auction.

References

1900 births
1968 deaths
People from Cynon Valley
Sportspeople from Rhondda Cynon Taf
Welsh footballers
Wales international footballers
Association football fullbacks
Swansea City A.F.C. players
Everton F.C. players
Newport County A.F.C. players
English Football League players